also known as Sakate Sima, Sakate-jima, or Sakate-shima, is an island located in Ise Bay off the east coast of central Honshu, Japan. It is administered as part of the city of Toba in Mie Prefecture. It is the smallest of the four inhabited islands of Toba, and is the closest of the four islands to the mainland. Landmarks in the area include Toba-kō and Nakanogō-eki. Time zone is Asia/Tokyo.

Sakatejima is connected to mainland Toba by a public ferry. Most of the population is engaged in commercial fishing or fish processing, tourism, or commute to mainland Toba for work.

References

External links

 Toba City website 

Islands of Mie Prefecture